Hood Baby is the debut studio album by American rapper Lil Gotit. It was released on November 16, 2018, by Alamo Records.

Background
It features 18 songs and collaborators including Gunna, Lil Duke, Lil Keed, Mal & Quill, Hoodrich Pablo Juan, Guap Tarantino and Slimelife Shawty. The album was named after Gotit "being in the hood" and being treated "like a little bro". Described as a "minor-key and trap-styled production" Gotit was said to have "remained lyrically subdued, his insight suggests a noted sense of authenticity, derived from a lifestyle many listeners will never understand."

Singles
"Drip Severe" was released as the lead single from the album, along with "Blue Slimes", with the latter being a non-album single.

Track listing
Credits adapted from Tidal.

Notes
 "Let's Go" is alternatively titled "Let's Go!" on some platforms

References

2018 debut albums
Lil Gotit albums